Juan Cavia (born 14 January 1984 in Buenos Aires, Argentina) is an Argentinian Production Designer, Art director and illustrator.

Biography
Juan Cavia developed his skills in painting, drawing, composition, dynamics and various techniques of representation and animation. After secondary school, he begins to study film while working as storyboard artist and concept designer.

Since 2005, he has been working as an art director for film, theater and advertising.

Comic Books
He was a co-author of  The Adventures of Dog Mendonca and Pizzaboy ( book trilogy ), Os vampiros and Comer Beber. He frequently collaborates with writer Filipe Melo and artist Santiago Villa. 
The forewords of volume I and volume II were written by legendary filmmakers John Landis, Tobe Hooper and George A. Romero.
In 2012 he illustrated a story for an anthology commemorating the 25th anniversary of Dark Horse Presents, a compilation featuring works by Frank Miller and Mike Mignola.

Films
As Production Designer, he worked for 9 feature films. He frequently collaborates with Walter Cornás ( Art director and Production Designer). Juan also was responsible for the set design of the film El Secreto de Sus Ojos - Oscar winner for best foreign film in 2010.

References
http://www.darkhorse.com/Comics/21-704/The-Untold-Tales-of-Dog-Mendonca-Pizzaboy-one-shot
http://expresso.sapo.pt/bd-editora-norte-americana-dark-horse-vai-publicar-historia-de-filipe-melo-e-juan-cavia=f621461
https://cornascavia.com/home

1984 births
Living people
Argentine art directors
Argentine production designers
Argentine storyboard artists
People from Buenos Aires